Klāra Anna Luīze Kalniņa, née Veilande (1874–1964), was a Latvian feminist, suffragette, editor, and politician, a long-time member of the Latvian Social Democratic Workers' Party ( (LSDSP)).

Life
Kalniņa was born in the village of Vanči in Courland Governorate, Russian Empire (today in Latvia) on 24 February 1874. She finished four grades of schooling in 1890 in Jelgava, where the language of instruction was German, not Latvian. She was admitted into the sixth grade of the Jelgava Gymnasium at the age of 20 and graduated in 1897 having completed the seventh grade. In the meantime, she had gone to St Petersburg, the capital of the Russian Empire, in an attempt to further her education, but was forced to return home in 1896 by financial difficulties. Kalniņa met her future husband, Pauls Kalniņš, in 1895 and they married three years later. They had one son, the politician Brūno Kalniņš. During the German occupation of Latvia during World War II, she and her husband participated in the pro-independence Latvian Central Council. After her husband's death in 1945, she fled to Sweden and lived there until she died in 1964.

Activities
While still a student, Kalniņa was one of the founders of a literary group, Aurora, that rejected the bourgeois idea that women's roles in life were limited to Kinder, Küche, Kirche. In the mid-1890s, she became involved in the New Current and the beginnings of the social democratic movements. While in St Petersburg, she participated in the activities of the Social Democrats there and then became active in organizing the social democratic group in Kurzeme from 1901 to 1903. Kalniņa and her husband left Russia that same year and lived in Germany and Switzerland until the outbreak of the 1905 Russian Revolution prompted their temporary return.

She was elected to the Constitutional Assembly of Latvia in 1920. Alongside Aspazija, Apolonija Laurinoviča, Valērija Seile and Berta Vesmane, she was one of five women elected to the proto-parliament.

Notes

References

1874 births
1964 deaths
People from Jelgava Municipality
People from Courland Governorate
Latvian Social Democratic Workers' Party politicians
Members of the People's Council of Latvia
Deputies of the Constitutional Assembly of Latvia
Latvian feminists
Latvian socialist feminists
20th-century Latvian women writers
20th-century Latvian writers
Latvian women's rights activists
20th-century Latvian women politicians
Latvian World War II refugees
Latvian emigrants to Sweden